"Dear Dad" was the 12th episode  of the first season of the TV series M*A*S*H. It originally aired on December 17, 1972 and was repeated on May 20, 1973.

Plot 

Hawkeye writes home to his father during the Christmas season, relating a number of amusing and personal anecdotes including Radar's effort to mail home a jeep piece-by-piece, the monthly morality lecture, Trapper's local medical philanthropy, and the ongoing non-secret relationship between Frank and Hot Lips. Hawkeye dresses to play Santa Claus for the local children, but is required to go to the front line via helicopter to treat an emergency, which he does in-costume.  

This was one of the first M*A*S*H episodes to challenge the traditional sitcom format by combining dramatic elements (specifically, the "war is hell" message) with comedic situations.

In the voiceover of Hawkeye writing to his father, he mentions "Christmas in Korea, as with you in Vermont".  In later episodes during the first three seasons, he would continue to cite Vermont as where he grew up.  However, starting in Season 4, that was changed to Crabapple Cove, Maine.

References

External links 
 

M*A*S*H (season 1) episodes
American Christmas television episodes
1972 American television episodes